"" is the national anthem of Angola. Rui Alberto Vieira Dias Mingas composed the music, while the lyrics were authored by Manuel Rui Alves Monteiro.  It was adopted as the national anthem in November 1975, when the country gained its independence from Portugal.  The lyrics make reference to several key events of the People's Movement for the Liberation of Angola (MPLA), which has been in power since independence and was the only party in Angola until 1992.

History 
The lyrics to the song were penned by Manuel Rui Alves Monteiro (1941–), an author who studied in Huambo and is affiliated with both the country's Writer Union and Union of Artists and Composers. He is one of the best-selling writers in the capital city Luanda – according to an "informal survey" conducted in July 2003 – and writes about "everyday life" in the country using satire and irony. The song was officially designated as the country's national anthem in 1975, when the country gained independence on November 11 of that year. It is enshrined under Article 164 of the constitution of Angola.

Proposed changes 
Its lyrics refer to several key events in the history of the MPLA.  However, this has been rendered "obsolete" since the end of the one-party state in 1992.  As a result, there have been efforts to modify the national anthem, along with other national symbols.  However, none of these have come to fruition, and the anthem remains unchanged as of 2014.

Lyrics 
The lyrics of "Angola Avante" allude to how the country and its people will progress forward in the future.  It has been classified by The Daily Telegraph′s Ivan Hewett as one of several contemporary national anthems that convey "a more martial tone" inspired by "La Marseillaise".

Portuguese (official language)

Kikongo (national language)

English translation

In popular culture 
The name of the national anthem is used as a nickname for an inter-community association football competition held to boost sports activities both in Angola and among people from the Portuguese-speaking African countries (PALOP) living in Portugal.  Hosted in Portugal in 2011 and 2013, the latter tournament featured teams from Brazil, Mozambique, Cape Verde, Guinea-Bissau, and São Tomé and Príncipe.  The 2011 sporting event coincided with and honoured the 36th anniversary of the independence of Angola.

Notes

References

External links 
 MP3 file

Angolan music
African anthems
National symbols of Angola
National anthem compositions in C major